Nur B. Ali (Urdu: نو ر علی ) (born October 12, 1974 in Karachi, Pakistan) is a Pakistani American race car driver. He is the first Pakistani to become a professional racing driver, and a former two-time Southwest Formula Mazda Series Champion. Ali also drove in the A1 Grand Prix series for Team Pakistan.

Early life
Nur was interested in racing since he was four years old when he lived in Germany. He moved to Texas with his family when he was 8 years old and he currently resides in Dallas suburb of Irving.

Nur graduated with a Bachelor of Arts degree in International Relations from American University in Washington, D.C. in 1998. He was Vice President of Washington, D.C. Federation of College Republicans in 1995 and interned for Congressman Joe Barton, R-Texas, in Washington, D.C. in 1995.

Racing career
After graduating from college, Ali pursued a career racing by going to Skip Barber Racing School. When he completed the course and picked up his racing license, Ali took part in the Skip Barber Formula Dodge Southern Race Series and becoming the first racing driver from Pakistan. In 2000, Ali and his brother set up Ali Motorsports, so that he could compete in the Southwest Formula Mazda Series which he won in 2001 and 2002. Then in 2006, he joined racing series A1 Grand Prix where he raced for A1 Team Pakistan for a season. In late 2007, Nur decided to switch to stock car racing, and after a successful test for Cunningham Motorsports, Ali drove in the 2008 Daytona ARCA 200. In 2009, he drove again for Cunningham Motorsports.  After joining the ARCA RE/MAX Series, Texas Governor Rick Perry presented Ali with an official commendation, and the Mayor of the city of Southlake, Texas, proclaimed January 25, 2008 as Nur Ali Day.

In 2012, Ali made his debut in the NASCAR Nationwide Series, driving for Rick Ware Racing in two events late in the season, but wrecked 3 cars in his first career start at Kansas Speedway and then was not cleared to race in his next attempt at Texas Motor Speedway.

He currently competes in the Global RallyCross Championship Lites series.

Racing record

(1) = Team standings.

NASCAR
(key) (Bold – Pole position awarded by qualifying time. Italics – Pole position earned by points standings or practice time. * – Most laps led.)

Nationwide Series

ARCA Racing Series
(key) (Bold – Pole position awarded by qualifying time. Italics – Pole position earned by points standings or practice time. * – Most laps led.)

Complete A1 Grand Prix results
(key) (Races in bold indicate pole position) (Races in italics indicate fastest lap)

Complete Global RallyCross Championship results

GRC Lites

Race cancelled.

References

Racing background
Ali's ARCA racing test drive
Day named after Nur Ali in Southlake
North Texan groundbreaking race car driver
Another racing chapter begins for Pakistani driver
Pakistan-born driver aims for NASCAR
Daytona: Nur Ali race report

External links
 
 

Living people
1974 births
Sportspeople from Karachi
Pakistani racing drivers
NASCAR drivers
ARCA Menards Series drivers
A1 Team Pakistan drivers
Indy Pro 2000 Championship drivers
Racing drivers from Dallas
American University School of International Service alumni
Pakistani emigrants to the United States
American sportspeople of Pakistani descent
A1 Grand Prix drivers
Performance Racing drivers